Cheryl Chou is a Singaporean actress, host and model. She joined the entertainment industry after being crowned Miss Universe Singapore 2016.

Personal life 
Chou was born and raised in Singapore until the age of 8 before moving to China, where she stayed for 10 years. She studied at the Shanghai Singapore International School and graduated with an IB Diploma at 18.

Both her parents are based in Shanghai. Her mother runs a wine machine distribution business and her father is an operations manager.

Chou spent her freshman year of college at the Savannah College of Art and Design, majoring in Fashion Marketing and Management. She then moved back to Singapore and attended LASALLE College of the Arts, majoring in BA (Hons) Fashion Media and Industries.

Aside from being able to speak fluent English and Mandarin, she is also able to converse effectively in Cantonese.

Miss Universe 
In 2016, Chou entered the Miss Universe Singapore pageant, where she won the title of Miss Universe Singapore 2016.

The judges found her answer to the question "What do you believe is the essence of a true Singapore woman?" during the Q&A segment to be best of the lot. Her response was: "A woman who is confident in her own skin and not afraid of failure and to follow her dreams."

In January 2017, she represented Singapore at the 65th Miss Universe competition in Manila, Philippines, but she did not place in the pageant.

Filmography

Television series

References

External links
 
 

1996 births
Living people
Miss Universe 2016 contestants
Singaporean female models
Singaporean television actresses